Edgar Charles Jones (13 February 1907 – 12 May 1970) was an Australian rules footballer who played with North Melbourne in the Victorian Football League (VFL).

Notes

External links 

1907 births
1970 deaths
Australian rules footballers from Victoria (Australia)
North Melbourne Football Club players